Sir Milo Boughton Butler   (11 August 190522 January 1979) was a Bahamian politician who served as the second governor-general of the Bahamas from 1973 to 1979. He died in office, aged 73.

Early life and family
Butler was born in Nassau, The Bahamas on 11 August 1905 to George Raleigh Butler and his wife Frances. He attended the George Washington School in Florida, the public school at Rum Cay, and the Boys' Central School in Nassau. At age 17, Butler began his own grocery business. On 14 October 1928, Butler married Caroline Loretta Watson. They had seven sons and three daughters.

Career and death
Butler entered electoral politics in 1936 as a member of the Progressive Liberal Party (PLP), when he unsuccessfully ran against Sir Harry Oakes in the Western District of New Providence. Although Butler was seen as a charismatic candidate who had the support of the working class voters, Oakes' team allegedly employed "questionable" means to win the election. The following year, Butler was elected to parliament following a by-election in the same constituency, relinquishing the office in 1947. 

In 1956, after the government imposed a 12-minute limit on parliamentary speeches, Butler threw the Speaker's hourglass out of the window at the House of Assembly. He returned as a member of parliament for the Western District the same year, serving for a decade. From 1967 to 1973, he represented Bain Town. 

After the PLP emerged victorious in the 1967 general election and formed a majority government, Butler became Minister of Health and Welfare followed by Minister of Labour, Agriculture and Fisheries a year later. In 1970, he was appointed as Minister of Agriculture and Fisheries, and in 1972 he became Minister without Portfolio. On 1 August 1973, Butler was appointed as the second Governor-General of the Bahamas by Elizabeth II, Queen of the Bahamas on the recommendation of Lynden Pindling, Prime Minister of The Bahamas and leader of the PLP. He served as Governor General until his death on 22 January 1979 in Nassau. 

Butler is buried at the cemetery next to the nineteenth-century St. Matthew's Anglican Church on Church and Shirley Streets.

On 14 November 1991, his son Milo Butler Jr. became Speaker of Parliament.

Recognition
In June 1972, Butler was honoured as a National Hero of the Bahamas following a Special Resolution by the Honourable House of Assembly. In 1973, he was appointed as a Knight Grand Cross of the Order of St Michael and St George (GCMG) by Queen Elizabeth II. In February 1975, following the Queen's visit to Nassau, he was made a Knight Grand Cross of the Royal Victorian Order (GCVO). A bronze statue of Butler designed by Bahamian sculptor Randolph Johnson was unveiled on 22 January 1986 at Rawson Square in downtown Nassau. In 2018, he was posthumously awarded the Bahamian Order of National Hero (NH).

References

1905 births
1979 deaths
Governors-General of the Bahamas
Knights Bachelor
Knights Grand Cross of the Order of St Michael and St George
Progressive Liberal Party politicians
People from Nassau, Bahamas
Labor ministers of the Bahamas